The Naivasha Stadium is a football stadium in Naivasha, Kenya. It is the home stadium of Karuturi Sports and Oserian F.C., both competing in the Kenyan Premier League, and holds 5,000 people. It is located along the Moi South Lake Road.

The stadium is nicknamed "Old Trafford", after the home stadium of English Premier League club Manchester United.

References
Kenyan Premier League – Sher Karuturi

Football venues in Kenya
Sport in Rift Valley Province
Multi-purpose stadiums in Kenya